Serbia competed at the 2008 Summer Paralympics in Beijing  for the first time as independent country. Serbian competitors took part in table tennis and athletics events. They won 2 silver medals, Borislava Perić in table tennis event and Draženko Mitrović in athletics.

Medalists

Sports

Athletics

Men's track

Men's field

Women's track

Women's field

Shooting

Men

Women

Table tennis

Men

Women

See also
2008 Summer Paralympics
Serbia at the Paralympics
Serbia at the 2008 Summer Olympics

External links
Beijing 2008 Paralympic Games Official Site
International Paralympic Committee

References

Nations at the 2008 Summer Paralympics
2008
Paralympics